My Girlfriend Is An Agent (lit. "7th Level Civil Servant") is a 2009 South Korean romantic action comedy film directed by Shin Tae-ra and starring Kim Ha-neul and Kang Ji-hwan. The film had 4,078,293 admissions nationwide and was the 4th most attended film of the year.

Synopsis
A Russian organized crime group takes possession of an advanced bio-chemical weapon from Korea with the help of a corrupt Korean scientist, and two special agents are the world's only hope to stop them. One is a veteran domestic secret agent named Ahn Soo-ji, who is a master martial artist and fencer. The other is a rookie international agent named Lee Jae-joon whose foundation in analytical work, rather than field work. The agents get into trouble when they consistently goofs up on the job and have an ill-fated relationship, when coincidentally they are dating and don't know each other's secret identities. The passion between them turns to madness, as the lies and secrets between them build until they nearly kill each other.  The only thing they can trust is the fact they love and hate each other. The tension builds as they attempt to work out their relationship, while working behind each other's backs, unknowingly on the same mission to save the world.

Cast
Kim Ha-neul as Ahn Soo-ji	
Kang Ji-hwan as Lee Jae-joon
Jang Young-nam as Team Leader Hong 
Ryu Seung-ryong as Won-seok
 Kang Shin-il as Dr. No
 Yoo Seung-mok as Police officer Jang
 Jang Nam Yul as Department head Jo
Elizabeth Sujin Ford as Sonya Victoria

Awards and nominations
2009 Grand Bell Awards
 Best New Actor – Kang Ji-hwan

2009 Blue Dragon Film Awards
 Nomination – Best Actress – Kim Ha-neul
 Nomination – Best Supporting Actress – Jang Young-nam

Remake
It was remade as a television series 7th Grade Civil Servant, starring Choi Kang-hee and Joo Won, which aired on the South Korean network Munhwa Broadcasting Corporation (MBC) in 2013.

In 2011, the remake rights were acquired by UTV Movies. The Bollywood remake will be co-produced by UTV Movies and director-turned-producer Imtiaz Ali, and directed by choreographer Bosco (of Bosco-Caesar fame), with Shahid Kapoor as the male lead and Katrina Kaif as the female lead.
The film was cancelled.

References

External links 
   
 

2009 films
2009 romantic comedy films
South Korean romantic comedy films
South Korean spy comedy films
2000s spy comedy films
Films directed by Shin Tae-ra
2000s Korean-language films
Lotte Entertainment films
2000s South Korean films